Samarasimha Reddy  is a 1999 Indian Telugu-language action drama film, produced by Chengala Venkat Rao under Satyanarayanamma Productions banner and directed by B. Gopal. It stars Nandamuri Balakrishna in the titular role alongside Anjala Zaveri, Simran, Sanghavi, and music composed by Mani Sharma. The film is written by V. Vijayendra Prasad along with Ratna Kumar and Paruchuri brothers. 

Samarasimha Reddy released on 13 January 1999 and was commercially successful. It earned a distributor share of 20 crore on a budget of 6 crore. The film won a Filmfare Award South and a Nandi Award. It was dubbed and released into Tamil under the title Shanmuga Pandian.

Plot 
Kanthamma, a shrewd woman running a small-scale hotel, torments her stepchildren Vasu & his 3 sisters Sangeeta, Sarala, & Saraswati, where Vasu revolts over Kanthamma and quits the house. Years roll by, Kanthamma goes into bankruptcy of a charming Srikakulam Chittamma who entices customers as an opponent. All the while, an energetic Abbulu joins as an employee at Kanthamma and spins her business to prosperity. Just then, the 3 sisters sight their childhood photograph with him when he affirms himself as Vaasu. Anyhow, he asks them to quiet as their aunt drives him away again. Presently, Abbulu aims to perform nuptials of Sangeeta, educate Sarala, & recoup paralyzed Saraswati. Hence, he strives hard to accumulate money and wangles Kanathamma. 

Consequently, Abbulu squabbles with Chittamma resulting in several, falls for him, where he hides from the sons of savage amputee factionist Veera Raghava Reddy who are intensively in search of him. Therefore, Abbulu ably makes them seized by the cops when the local SP gets startled and bows his head down before Abbulu. Frenzied, Veera Raghava Reddy calls his daughter Anjali from abroad who inflames and pledges to seek vengeance. In the interim, the siblings of notorious goon, Aakula Bandabbai teases Sangeeta when Abbulu thumps them. Angered, Bandabbai forcibly tries to knit Sangeeta with his brother by bribing greedy Kanthamma. Before this time, Abbulu recovers Saraswati facing a risk, early saves Sangeeta too, and warns Kanthamma declaring himself as Vaasu. As a flabbergast, Anjali arrives proclaiming him as a homicide of Vaasu names Samarasimha Reddy. 

Being cognizant of it, the 3 girls loathe and treat him like feces. Plus, he is battered by men of Anjali which he thresholds with patience. Chittamma shelters him to whom Abbulu/Vaasu/Samarasimha Reddy divulges his story. As soon as, Samarasimha Reddy is hindered by his sisters when he is conducting obsequies of Vaasu and an argument raises. Then, Anjali turns it in her favor and makes Samarasimha Reddy drink poison and collapse. Parallelly, Bandabbai’s gang raids on 3 when Samarasimha Reddy awakes and thrashes them. Immediately, he is admitted to the hospital where SP states the eminence of Samarasimha Reddy and spins rearward. 

Samarasimha Reddy is a roaring lion of Rayalaseema son of powerful factionist Narasimha Reddy. After getting out of home Vaasu is nurtured by him as a younger and he is his true blue. Veera Raghava Reddy upholds fierce rivalry with them. Once, Samarasimha Reddy backs triumphing on Veera Raghava Reddy when he heckles and Samarasimha Reddy violently counterstrikes him. Meanwhile, Samarasimha Reddy’s alliance is fixed with his cousin Deepika and the entire family proceeds to shop. Wherefore, Veera Raghava Reddy that flames with ignominy ruses slaughter them by backstabbing. Spotting it, Samarasimha Reddy onslaughts on Veera Raghava Reddy lives him alive by amputating as a penalty. Accidentally, Vaasu dies in that combat by the stab of Samarasimha Reddy. Before leaving the breath, Samarasimha Reddy words Vaasu to guard his sisters. As per his wish, support them with his hard earnings only. 

Listening to it, everyone understands his virtue even Anjali also remorseful. Currently, with the guidance of Chittamma Anjali decide to espouse Samarasimha Reddy. Informed thereof, her brothers attempt to slay her when Veera Raghava Reddy impedes them and moves with the proposal. Initially, Samarasimha Reddy refuses but at the request of all be in accord to establish peace. Soon after the wedding, Veera Raghava Reddy runs through Anjali, uttering her as the wife of the enemy but she is secured. Samarasimha Reddy revolts when the entire terrain reforms including Veera Raghava Reddy’s sons viewing his righteousness. At last, Veera Raghava Reddy is unable to tolerate his success and commits suicide. Finally, the movie ends on a happy note.

Cast

Production 
Writers Paruchuri brothers and director B. Gopal discussed nearly 25 to 30 Stories for this film. Finally, they finalized this story. At that time for a few years, love and family-based Stories dominated. It was the only film that became a box-office hit without a love track at that time. And also it is the first film which was an industry hit with a faction-based storyline. This film showed the path to Telugu filmmakers to make a successful commercial film. In the later years, many faction-based story movies were made in Telugu film industry.

Filming took place at Ramoji Film City in Hyderabad.

Soundtrack 

Music was composed by Mani Sharma. Music released on Supreme Music Company. All Songs chartbusters tracks.

Reception

Critical reception 
Full Hyderabad rated the film 7.5 and wrote, "The biggest strength of the film is its script that has action and sentiments in the right combination."

Box office 
The film had a 227-day run at three theatres, 175 days run at (28 direct + 1 shift) total 29 centres, 50 days at 122 centres, 100 days at 72 direct and late & indirect 32 centres, total 104, and also had a 365-day run at one theatre.

Awards 
Filmfare Awards South
Filmfare Award for Best Director – Telugu – B. Gopal

Nandi Awards
Best Costume Designer – Rambabu

References

External links 
 

1990s action drama films
1990s masala films
1990s Telugu-language films
1999 films
Films about feuds
Films directed by B. Gopal
Films scored by Mani Sharma
Indian action drama films